Jodie Devos (born 10 October 1988 in Libramont-Chevigny) is a Belgian operatic soprano, the second prize winner of the Queen Elisabeth Competition in 2014.

Performances 
 Ida and then Adèle in Strauss's Die Fledermaus, Opéra Comique, 2014
Alice in Rossini's Le Comte Ory, Opéra Comique, 2014
Rosina in Rossini's The Barber of Seville, Opéra Royal de Wallonie, 2015
The title role in Delibes's Lakmé, Opéra Royal de Wallonie, 2017 
The Fire, the Princess and the Nightingale in Ravel's L’Enfant et les sortilèges, Opéra national de Montpellier, 2017
 Eurydice in Offenbach's Orpheus in the Underworld, Opéra Royal de Wallonie, 2017
Susanna in Mozart's The Marriage of Figaro, Opéra Royal de Wallonie, 2018
L'amour in Gluck's Orphée et Eurydice, Capitole de Toulouse, 2018
Jemmy in Rossini's Guillaume Tell, Chorégies d'Orange, 2019
The Queen of the Night in Mozart's The Magic Flute, Opéra Bastille, 2019
Zerbinetta in Strauss's Ariadne auf Naxos, Opéra national de Montpellier, 2020
Princess Elsbeth in Offenbach's Fantasio, Opéra Comique, 2020
Olimpia in Offenbach's Tales of Hoffmann, Opéra Bastille, 2020
Marie in Donizetti's Daughter of the Regiment, Opéra Royal de Wallonie, 2021
Philine in Thomas's Mignon, Opéra Royal de Wallonie, 2022

References

External links 
 Official website
 

1988 births
Living people
People from Libramont-Chevigny
Belgian operatic sopranos
Prize-winners of the Queen Elisabeth Competition